{{Infobox person
| name                  = Dan Scanlon
| image                 = Dan Scanlon.jpg
| caption               = Scanlon at the 2013 Annecy International Animated Film Festival
| birth_date            = 
| birth_place           = Clawson, Michigan, U.S.
| othername             = 
| alma_mater            = Columbus College of Art and Design
| occupation            = 
| years_active          = 1998–present
| spouse                = Michele Scanlon
| employer              = Pixar Animation Studios (2001–present)
| website               = 
| notable_works         = Monsters UniversityOnward
}}

Dan Scanlon (born June 21, 1976) is an American animator, storyboard artist, director, and screenwriter, working for Pixar, for whom he has directed Monsters University and Onward.

Early life
Scanlon grew up in Clawson, Michigan. When he was one year old and his brother three years old, their father died, and when they were teenagers, a relative gave them a brief audio recording of their father. Scanlon has said that these experiences helped inspire the story of Onward. He graduated with a BFA from the Columbus College of Art and Design in 1998.

Career
Scanlon was an animator for The Indescribable Nth and Joseph: King of Dreams. He served as a storyboard artist for The Little Mermaid II: Return to the Sea and 101 Dalmatians II: Patch's London Adventure.

Scanlon joined Pixar in 2001, where he was a story artist for Cars and  Toy Story 3. He co-directed the short film Mater and the Ghostlight. He illustrated part one of Unmentionables, a comic book written by his wife, Michele Scanlon, and wrote and directed the live-action feature film Tracy. Tracy was Scanlon's first feature film as a writer/director. He also served as a member of the senior creative team on Brave and Inside Out.

Scanlon directed the prequel film of Monsters, Inc., Monsters University, released in 2013, to positive reviews and commercial success. He subsequently directed the fantasy-road trip film Onward (2020), featuring the voices of Tom Holland, Chris Pratt, Julia Louis-Dreyfus and Octavia Spencer. It was nominated for an Academy Award for Best Animated Feature, but lost to another Pixar film Soul''.

Scanlon and his wife Michele live in San Francisco and work together on projects under the production company name Caveat Productions.

Filmography

Feature films

Independent Films

Short films

Other Credits

References

External links
 

1976 births
Animators from Michigan
American male screenwriters
American storyboard artists
American animated film directors
Artists from San Francisco
Columbus College of Art and Design alumni
Film directors from San Francisco
Film directors from Michigan
Living people
Pixar people
Screenwriters from California
Screenwriters from Michigan
Walt Disney Animation Studios people